Yuliia Ivanytska (born 27 October 1988) is a Ukrainian Paralympic judoka. She won one of the bronze medals in the women's 48 kg event at the 2020 Summer Paralympics held in Tokyo, Japan.

References 

Living people
1988 births
Ukrainian female judoka
Paralympic judoka of Ukraine
Paralympic bronze medalists for Ukraine
Paralympic medalists in judo
Judoka at the 2020 Summer Paralympics
Medalists at the 2020 Summer Paralympics
Sportspeople from Rivne
21st-century Ukrainian women